Ford Donovan Parker (born August 16, 1996) is an American soccer player who currently plays for New Mexico United in the USL Championship.

Career

Youth, college & amateur 
Parker played youth soccer with Rio Rapids from 2013 to 2015, before going to play college soccer at the University of New Mexico. Parker redshirted in 2015, then missed most of the 2016 season and the entire 2017 season. Parker made 14 further appearances for the Lobos in his junior year. For his senior year, Parker transferred to the University of California, Irvine, where he made 18 appearances for the Anteaters.

Whilst at college, Bauer also played in the USL PDL with spells at Colorado Rapids U23 in 2017 and Albuquerque Sol in 2018.

Professional 
On February 4, 2020, Parker signed his first professional contract with USL Championship side Birmingham Legion after impressing the club at an open tryout. Parker made his professional debut on August 29, 2020, starting in a 4–1 win over Charlotte Independence.

On March 1, 2022, Parker signed with New Mexico United in his home state. He made his debut with the club on April 5, 2022 in the Second Round of the 2022 U.S. Open Cup, keeping a clean sheet in a 5-0 win over Las Vegas Legends. He made his second appearance in the Third Round, as New Mexico United lost 2-1 away at Phoenix Rising.

References

External links 
 Ford Parker - Men's Soccer UC Irvine bio
 Ford Parker New Mexico bio
 Ford Parker Birmingham Legion bio

1996 births
American soccer players
Association football goalkeepers
Albuquerque Sol FC players
Birmingham Legion FC players
Colorado Rapids U-23 players
Living people
New Mexico Lobos men's soccer players
New Mexico United players
Soccer players from Albuquerque, New Mexico
UC Irvine Anteaters men's soccer players
USL Championship players
USL League Two players